The Palazzo del Credito Italiano is a historic building situated in Piazza Cordusio in Milan, Italy.

History 
The building, completed in 1901, was designed by the Italian architect Luigi Broggi. It was inaugurated on August 25, 1902. It housed the seat of the Italian banking group Unicredit until its offices were moved in the newly built Unicredit Tower in 2013.

Description 
The building is situated in Piazza Cordusio, a major square in the centre of Milan, and is adjacent to the Magazzini Contratti. It features a concave façade which adapts itself to the elliptic shape of the square.

References

External links

Buildings and structures in Milan